Pavle Jovanović may refer to:

Paja Jovanović (1859–1957), Serbian painter
Pavle Jovanovic (bobsledder) (1977–2020), Olympic bobsledder
Pavle Jovanović, founder of the Serbian Autonomous Party in Croatia, 1873
Pavle Jovanović (mayor), mayor of Novi Sad, Serbia 1848–1849 and 1849–1850